Doğançay may refer to:

Doğançay Museum, Turkey's first contemporary art museum
Doğançay, Mardin, village in the district of Midyat, Mardin Province, Turkey
Doğançay, Mersin, village in the district of Mezitli, Mersin Province, Turkey

People with the surname
Adil Doğançay (born 1900), Turkish painter and father of painter Burhan Dogançay
Burhan Doğançay (1929–2013), Turkish-American artist

Turkish-language surnames